The Dykyi Sad archaeological site constitutes the remains of an ancient port city discovered in the Dykyi Sad park in Mykolaiv, Ukraine. The site is dated to the Bilozerska culture, around 1250–925 BC.

Researchers have proposed that the site is the "City of the Cimmerians" mentioned by Homer in the Odyssey. Though the geography of the Odyssey is a contentious field, if true, this would make Mykolaiv the oldest city in Ukraine that is mentioned in written sources. On February 22, 2016, the Mykolaiv City Council published a petition to create an open-air park-museum, the Wild Garden settlement.

References

Archaeological sites in Ukraine
History of Mykolaiv Oblast
Former cities in Ukraine